James M. Brown may refer to:

 James M. Brown (attorney) (born 1941), Attorney General of Oregon from 1980 to 1981
 James M. Brown (coach) (1892–1965), American college football, basketball, and baseball coach
 James MacLellan Brown ( – 1967), Scottish architect
 James Mellor Brown, British cleric and scriptural geologist